"Remember" is Fayray's 11th single. It was released on February 20, 2002 and peaked at #52. It was used as the image song for the TV program "20th Anniversary 2002 Yokohama Kokusai Shoujo Ekiden". The coupling is a cover of Daryl Hall & John Oates's "Private Eyes".

Track listing
Remember
Private Eyes

Charts 
"Remember" - Oricon Sales Chart (Japan)

External links
FAYRAY OFFICIAL SITE

2002 singles
Fayray songs
Songs written by Fayray
2002 songs